Pheropsophus is a genus of ground beetles in the family Carabidae.

Species
These 163 species are members of the genus Pheropsophus

 Pheropsophus abbreviatus Arrow, 1901  (sub-Saharan Africa)
 Pheropsophus abyssinicus Alluaud, 1916  (Ethiopia)
 Pheropsophus acutecostatus Fairmaire, 1892  (Madagascar)
 Pheropsophus adrianae Giachino, 2005  (Indonesia and New Guinea)
 Pheropsophus aequinoctialis (Linnaeus, 1763)  (Mexico, Central, and South America)
 Pheropsophus africanus (Dejean, 1825)  (North Africa and Southwest Asia)
 Pheropsophus agnatus Chaudoir, 1876  (Asia)
 Pheropsophus akhaensis Kirschenhofer, 2010  (Thailand)
 Pheropsophus alexandrae Giachino, 2003  (Australia)
 Pheropsophus amnicola Darlington, 1968  (New Guinea)
 Pheropsophus andrewesi Jedlicka, 1964  (India)
 Pheropsophus androyanus Alluaud, 1932
 Pheropsophus angolensis (Erichson, 1843)  (Sub-Saharan Africa)
 Pheropsophus aptinoides Chaudoir, 1876  (India)
 Pheropsophus aptinomorphus Heller, 1910  (Indonesia and New Guinea)
 Pheropsophus arabicus Arrow, 1901  (Middle East)
 Pheropsophus arcanus (Erichson, 1843)  (Sub-Saharan Africa)
 Pheropsophus assimilis Chaudoir, 1876  (East and Southeast Asia)
 Pheropsophus azoulayi Lassalle & Schnell, 2018  (Philippines)
 Pheropsophus baehri Giachino, 2005  (Indonesia and New Guinea)
 Pheropsophus baliothorax Heller, 1910  (Indonesia and New Guinea)
 Pheropsophus balkei Giachino, 2005  (Indonesia and New Guinea)
 Pheropsophus basiguttatus Chaudoir, 1876  (Sub-Saharan Africa)
 Pheropsophus beauvoisi (Dejean, 1825)
 Pheropsophus beckeri Jedlicka, 1930  (China and temperate Asia)
 Pheropsophus bequaerti Burgeon, 1937  (Sub-Saharan Africa)
 Pheropsophus bidoupensis Fedorenko, 2013  (Vietnam)
 Pheropsophus bimaculatus (Linnaeus, 1771)  (South Asia)
 Pheropsophus bipartitus Fairmaire, 1869  (Madagascar)
 Pheropsophus biplagiatus Chaudoir, 1876  (Mexico)
 Pheropsophus bisulcatus Chaudoir, 1843  (Africa)
 Pheropsophus bohemani Chaudoir, 1876  (Africa)
 Pheropsophus borkuanus Bruneau de Miré, 1990  (Chad)
 Pheropsophus brussinoi Giachino, 2005  (Indonesia and New Guinea)
 Pheropsophus canis Darlington, 1968  (New Guinea)
 Pheropsophus capensis Chaudoir, 1876  (Sub-Saharan Africa)
 Pheropsophus capitatus Jedlicka, 1935  (Philippines)
 Pheropsophus cardoni Maindron, 1898  (India)
 Pheropsophus catoirei (Dejean, 1825)  (Southern Asia)
 Pheropsophus catulus Darlington, 1968  (New Guinea)
 Pheropsophus chaudoiri Arrow, 1901  (Indomalaya)
 Pheropsophus cincticollis (LaFerté-Sénectère, 1850)  (Sub-Saharan Africa)
 Pheropsophus cinctus (Gory, 1833)  (Africa and the Middle-East)
 Pheropsophus claudiae Giachino, 2005  (New Guinea)
 Pheropsophus congoensis Arrow, 1901  (Sub-Saharan Africa)
 Pheropsophus consularis (Schmidt-Goebel, 1846)  (Indomalaya)
 Pheropsophus darwini Giachino, 2003  (Australia)
 Pheropsophus debauvii (Guérin-Méneville, 1838)  (South America)
 Pheropsophus delmastroi Giachino, 2005  (Indonesia and New Guinea)
 Pheropsophus devagiriensis Venugopal & Sabu, 2019  (India)
 Pheropsophus dilatatus Burgeon, 1936  (Ghana)
 Pheropsophus dimidiatus Arrow, 1901  (Sub-Saharan Africa)
 Pheropsophus dissolutus Andrewes, 1923  (Asia)
 Pheropsophus dongnaiensis (Fedorenko, 2021)  (Vietnam)
 Pheropsophus dregei Chaudoir, 1876  (Sub-Saharan Africa)
 Pheropsophus dux Chaudoir, 1876  (Ethiopia)
 Pheropsophus ecuadorensis Hubenthal, 1911  (Ecuador)
 Pheropsophus emarginatus Chaudoir, 1876  (Asia, Philippines)
 Pheropsophus erjanii Hrdlicka, 2017  (Indonesia)
 Pheropsophus exiguus Arrow, 1901  (the Democratic Republic of the Congo)
 Pheropsophus fastigiatus (Linnaeus, 1764)  (Sub-Saharan Africa)
 Pheropsophus fimbriatus Chaudoir, 1876  (Indomalaya)
 Pheropsophus fulminans (Fabricius, 1801)
 Pheropsophus fumigatus (Dejean, 1825)  (Philippines)
 Pheropsophus galloi Giachino, 2005  (Indonesia and New Guinea)
 Pheropsophus gironieri Eydoux & Souleyet, 1839  (Indonesia and Philippines)
 Pheropsophus glabricollis (Fedorenko, 2020)  (Vietnam)
 Pheropsophus globulicollis Hubenthal, 1918
 Pheropsophus gracilis Arrow, 1901
 Pheropsophus gregoryi Giachino, 2003  (Australia)
 Pheropsophus guanxiensis Kirschenhofer, 2010  (China and Vietnam)
 Pheropsophus guineensis Chaudoir, 1876
 Pheropsophus halteri (Chaudoir, 1837)
 Pheropsophus hassenteufeli Straneo, 1960  (Philippines)
 Pheropsophus heathi Arrow, 1901  (Myanmar)
 Pheropsophus hilaris (Fabricius, 1798)  (Southern Asia)
 Pheropsophus hispanicus (Dejean, 1824)  (North Africa and the Mediterranean)
 Pheropsophus humeralis Chaudoir, 1843  (the Comoro Islands, Madagascar, and Seychelles)
 Pheropsophus impressicollis LaFerté-Sénectère, 1850
 Pheropsophus indicus Venugopal & Sabu, 2019  (India)
 Pheropsophus infantulus Bates, 1892  (Myanmar, Thailand, and Vietnam)
 Pheropsophus iranicus Reitter, 1919  (Iran)
 Pheropsophus jakli Hrdlicka, 2015  (Indonesia)
 Pheropsophus jandai Hrdlicka, 2019  (New Guinea and Papua)
 Pheropsophus javanus (Dejean, 1825)  (Palearctic)
 Pheropsophus jessoensis A.Morawitz, 1862  (Eastern Asia)
 Pheropsophus jurinei (Dejean, 1825)  (Africa)
 Pheropsophus kabelkai Hrdlicka, 2015  (Indonesia)
 Pheropsophus katangensis Burgeon, 1937  (the Democratic Republic of the Congo)
 Pheropsophus kersteni Gerstaecker, 1867  (Africa)
 Pheropsophus kolbei Hubenthal, 1914
 Pheropsophus krichna (Maindron, 1906)  (India)
 Pheropsophus lafertei Arrow, 1901
 Pheropsophus langenhani Hubenthal, 1911  (Brazil)
 Pheropsophus laticostis Chaudoir, 1876
 Pheropsophus lineifrons Chaudoir, 1850  (India and Pakistan)
 Pheropsophus lissoderus Chaudoir, 1850  (Indomalaya)
 Pheropsophus livingstoni Arrow, 1901  (Sub-Saharan Africa)
 Pheropsophus longipennis Chaudoir, 1843
 Pheropsophus lumawigi Hrdlicka, 2019  (Philippines)
 Pheropsophus maculicollis Hubenthal, 1914  (the Democratic Republic of the Congo)
 Pheropsophus madagascariensis (Dejean, 1831)  (Madagascar)
 Pheropsophus malaisei Landin, 1955  (Myanmar)
 Pheropsophus marginatus (Dejean, 1825)  (Africa)
 Pheropsophus marginicollis Motschulsky, 1854  (China)
 Pheropsophus marginipennis (Laporte, 1835)
 Pheropsophus mashunus Péringuey, 1896  (Sub-Saharan Africa)
 Pheropsophus minahassae Heller, 1903  (Indonesia)
 Pheropsophus minor Murray, 1857  (Sub-Saharan Africa)
 Pheropsophus montanus (Fedorenko, 2020)  (Vietnam)
 Pheropsophus nanodes Bates, 1892  (China and India)
 Pheropsophus nebulosus Chaudoir, 1876  (Asia)
 Pheropsophus nepalensis Kirschenhofer, 2010  (Nepal)
 Pheropsophus ngoclinhensis Fedorenko, 2013  (Vietnam)
 Pheropsophus nigerrimus Jedlicka, 1935  (Philippines)
 Pheropsophus nigricollis Arrow, 1901  (India)
 Pheropsophus nigriventris Chaudoir, 1878  (Africa)
 Pheropsophus nyasae Arrow, 1901
 Pheropsophus obiensis Hrdlicka, 2014  (Indonesia)
 Pheropsophus obliquatus (J.Thomson, 1858)
 Pheropsophus obliteratus Fedorenko, 2013  (Vietnam)
 Pheropsophus occipitalis (W.S.MacLeay, 1825)  (Asia)
 Pheropsophus pallidepunctatus Arrow, 1901
 Pheropsophus palmarum Chaudoir, 1876  (Ivory Coast)
 Pheropsophus parallelus (Dejean, 1825)  (Africa)
 Pheropsophus pauliani Colas, 1944  (Cameroon)
 Pheropsophus pedes Darlington, 1968  (Indonesia and New Guinea)
 Pheropsophus perroti Arrow, 1901  (Madagascar)
 Pheropsophus planti Chaudoir, 1876  (Mozambique and South Africa)
 Pheropsophus platycephalus Reichardt, 1967  (Mexico)
 Pheropsophus prophylax Heller, 1903  (India)
 Pheropsophus raffrayi Chaudoir, 1878  (Africa)
 Pheropsophus recticollis Arrow, 1901  (the Democratic Republic of the Congo)
 Pheropsophus reductus Colas, 1944
 Pheropsophus riedeli Giachino, 2005  (Indonesia and New Guinea)
 Pheropsophus rivierii (Demay, 1838)  (South America)
 Pheropsophus rolex Morvan, 1995  (Nepal)
 Pheropsophus rufimembris Fairmaire, 1901
 Pheropsophus sangirensis Hrdlicka, 2017  (Indonesia)
 Pheropsophus scythropus Andrewes, 1923  (South Asia)
 Pheropsophus senegalensis (Dejean, 1825)  (Africa)
 Pheropsophus siamensis Chaudoir, 1876  (Southeast Asia)
 Pheropsophus similis Fedorenko, 2013  (Vietnam)
 Pheropsophus sobrinus (Dejean, 1826)  (South Asia)
 Pheropsophus sonae Hrdlicka, 2015  (Nigeria)
 Pheropsophus stenoderus Chaudoir, 1850  (Indomalaya)
 Pheropsophus stenopterus Chaudoir, 1878
 Pheropsophus straneoi Giachino, 2003  (Australia)
 Pheropsophus sumatrensis (Fedorenko, 2021)  (Indonesia)
 Pheropsophus taclobanensis Lassalle & Schnell, 2019  (Philippines)
 Pheropsophus talaudensis Hrdlicka, 2014  (Indonesia)
 Pheropsophus tamdaoensis Kirschenhofer, 2010  (Vietnam)
 Pheropsophus transvaalensis Péringuey, 1896  (South Africa and Zimbabwe)
 Pheropsophus tripustulatus (Fabricius, 1792)  (India and Thailand)
 Pheropsophus tristis Arrow, 1901  (Africa)
 Pheropsophus ubomboensis Barker, 1919  (South Africa)
 Pheropsophus uelensis Burgeon, 1937  (the Democratic Republic of the Congo)
 Pheropsophus uniformis Hubenthal, 1914  (Africa)
 Pheropsophus verticalis (Dejean, 1825)  (Australia, Oceania)
 Pheropsophus windjanae Baehr, 2012  (Australia)
 Pheropsophus wolfi Giachino, 2005  (Indonesia and New Guinea)
 Pheropsophus worthingtoni 
 Pheropsophus yunnanensis Kirschenhofer, 2010  (China)

References

External links

 

Brachininae